Monika Hilmerová (born October 7, 1974 in ČSSR) is a Slovak actress. She is a winner of the Silver Dolphin award received in 2001 at the annual Festroia International Film Festival in Setúbal, Portugal as the Best Actress for her performance in Der Lebensborn - Pramen života (2000).
The actress appears in multi-language productions, including the Czech, Slovak, English and/or German. Among others, she co-starred in the Golden Globe-nominated Uprising (2001) by Jon Avnet, Silvio Soldini's movie Brucio nel vento (2002) (e.g. Nastro d'Argento award, BM IFF award and/or Flaiano FF award) and the U.S. Emmy Award-winning TV-miniseries Frankenstein (2004) by Kevin Connor. In March 2010, the actress was named a UNICEF Goodwill Ambassador.

Biography
Hilmerová was born in the Slovak capital of former Czechoslovakia. She studied andragogy at the Faculty of Arts, Comenius University, while also acting at the Academy of Performing Arts, both in Bratislava.  At age sixteen, she played on the stage of the Naive Theatre Radošina.  Later on, she joined the scene of the Slovak National Theatre in 2003. The actress is married to dancer/choreographer with whom she has a daughter.

Filmography

Feature films

Television

Notes
 A  Denotes a short film.
 B  Denotes a TV-series.
 C  Denotes a televised theatre play.
 D  Denotes a TV sitcom.
 E  Denotes a talk show.
 F  Denotes a reality show.

Awards

Discography
2008: Veľkí herci spievajú malým deťom II, CD compilation by various artists (including a book);

References
General
 
 

Specific

External links 

 
 Monika Hilmerová by Google Images
 
 Monika Hilmerová at Slovak Film Database

1975 births
Living people
Actors from Bratislava
Slovak stage actresses
Slovak film actresses
Slovak television actresses
20th-century Slovak actresses